Myrina (Also known as Kastro) is a former municipality on the island of Lemnos, North Aegean, Greece. Since the 2011 local government reform it is part of the municipality Lemnos, of which it is a municipal unit. Its municipal seat was the town of Mýrina (pop. 5,107 at the 2001 census), located in the middle of the island's west coast. The town is also the capital of Lemnos, as well as the seat of the Metropolitan (Greek Orthodox bishop) of Lemnos. In addition to the town of Myrina, the municipal unit includes the communities of Káspakas (792), Platý (785), Thános (451), and Kornós (267). The 2011 census recorded 5,711 residents in the town and 8,006 residents in the municipal unit.

Climate 

The climate in Lemnos is mainly Mediterranean. Myrina has a hot summer Mediterranean climate(Köppen:Csa) The winters are generally mild, but there will be a snowfall occasionally. Strong winds are a feature of the island, especially in August and in winter time, hence its nickname "the wind-ridden one" (in Greek, Ανεμόεσσα). The temperature is typically 2 to 5 degrees Celsius less than in Athens, especially in summertime. Myrina is relatively dry, due to the rain shadow caused by the Pindus Mountains.

History
According to Herodotus, when the Chersonese on the Hellespont came under Athens' rule, Miltiades the son of Cimon came from Elaeus on the Chersonese to Lemnos where he proclaimed the Pelasgians must submit. The Hephaestians obeyed, giving up their city, but the Myrinaeans from the city Myrina would not be as easily pursued until they too submitted to Athens, thus given control of the island to Miltiades and the Athenians. (Herodotus: The Histories (ed. A. D. Godley, 1920), Cambridge. Harvard University Press. Cited February 2004 from The Perseus Project)

The ancient town also garnered notice of Pliny the Elder who wrote that the shadow of Mount Athos could be seen in the town's forum on the summer solstice. Other authors of antiquity who note the town include Ptolemy and Stephanus of Byzantium.

The town of Myrina 

	
Modern day Myrina is built upon a shallow bay split into two by a promontory jutting out to sea and carrying the ruins of a Venetian castle. To the north of the promontory lies the so-called Roman Shore (in Greek, Ρωμέικος Γιαλός), along which the Greek community had their homes during Ottoman times (until the Capture of Lemnos in 1912, during the First Balkan War). The name "Roman" dates to the East Roman or Byzantine Empire, when Greeks were called Romans (Ρωμιοί). To the south of the promontory lies the  Turkish Shore (Τούρκικος Γιαλός), along which the Turkish community similarly had their homes, before the exchange of populations between Greece and Turkey.

In 2001 the town had 3,022 regular dwellings, of which 30.4% were stone-built, and 75.6% had pitched roofs made of red tiles (source: 18.3.2001 Census, National Statistical Service of Greece).

Town quarters 

Behind the fronts of the two Shores, the town is divided into 4 parts: the old town core (encompassing the aforementioned Shores), referred to as Kastro (after the Castle atop the promontory); Androni, to the north (where the women of prehistoric Lemnos are said to have drugged their men before tossing them from the cliff of Petasos (the north horn of the bay of Myrina)); Tchas (most probably from the Russian word часовой, which means sentinel, sentry, or guard, because there was a Russian garrison stationed there for a short time at the end of the 18th century; less probably from the Russian word час, which means hour), just behind the harbour area; and Nea Madetos, a new (post-1980) settlement of workers´and fishermen's houses on the hill overlooking the Turkish shore from the south. The heart of the town is the market street, running north to south, and joining the Roman Shore to the Turkish Shore. Other landmarks are the OTE (Hellenic Telecoms Organisation) square, also called the bank square because it is the hub of all bank branches of the island, halfway along the market street, and the Perivola square, behind the Roman Shore, where the Lemnos bus station is (providing bus service from Myrina to the villages and back). The Town Hall building is located in the harbour, near the Port Authority building. Myrina also boasts a good provincial hospital, in the Tchas quarter, while presently is in the process of modernising its sewage system.

Town features 

Many of the town's streets are stone-paved alleys. The Roman Shore in particular is quite beautiful, aligned as it is with stone-built houses of neoclassical design (built from the mid-19th to the early 20th century), where the island's rich Greeks lived (many of the houses are still occupied by the descendants of those Greeks, most of whom made their fortunes as businessmen in British Egypt, part of the Greek diaspora there). The archaeological museum displays numerous exhibits from the island's remote (mostly prehistoric) past. With its clean, long, and sandy beaches, and its own Castle to boot, Myrina is a tourist attraction. Visitors and locals like bathing in the Roman Shore (or the Shallow Waters (in Greek, Ρηχά Νερά) beach, adjacent to the Roman Shore on the north), and having dinner at one of the fish taverns circling the traditional harbour in the Turkish Shore, enjoying the caiques there and a view of the castle at night. During the summer Myrina holds various outside theatrical and musical events.

Notable people 
Ilias Iliou (1904–1985), politician
Rallis Kopsidis (1929-2010), painter and writer
Panagiotis Magdanis (1990- ), Olympic rower

References

Mediterranean port cities and towns in Greece
Members of the Delian League
Populated places in the ancient Aegean islands
Lemnos
Populated places in Lemnos